In the United States, there have been two separate proposals to create a state with the name Lincoln:

 Lincoln (proposed Southern state), in Texas

 Lincoln (proposed Northwestern state), in Idaho and  Washington

See also
 State of Jefferson (disambiguation)
 List of U.S. state partition proposals
 Linconia

State name disambiguation pages